Roman Gąsienica Sieczka (30 April 1934 – 26 August 2006) was a Polish ski jumper. He competed in the individual event at the 1956 Winter Olympics.

References

1934 births
2006 deaths
Polish male ski jumpers
Olympic ski jumpers of Poland
Ski jumpers at the 1956 Winter Olympics
Sportspeople from Zakopane